= RNSS =

RNSS may mean:

- Radio navigation satellite service
- Regional navigation satellite system
